Ikeq is an island of the Kujalleq municipality, southern Greenland.

Geography
The island has an area of 194 km ² and a shoreline of 89.4 kilometres. 
Its coast is deeply indented and its eastern part (Qunnerit) is almost separated from the main island by a narrow inlet stretching from north to south.

Along with Itilleq, Sammisoq, Nunarsuaq (Nunarssuak), Pamialluk, Annikitsoq, Walkendorff and Qernertoq (Kasit), it is part of the Cape Farewell Archipelago (Nunap Isua).

See also
List of islands of Greenland

Bibliography

References

Uninhabited islands of Greenland
Kujalleq
Cape Farewell Archipelago